The Corporal and the Others is a 1965 Hungarian comedy film directed by Márton Keleti. The film was chosen to be part of the Budapest Twelve, a list of Hungarian films considered the best in 1968.

Cast 
 Imre Sinkovits - Corporal Ferenc Molnár
 Iván Darvas - Second Lieutenant Eduárd Gálfy
 Tamás Major - Albert, a butler
  - István Szíjjártó, a Communist
  - Lieutenant Barkányi, an Arrow Cross Party member
  - Private Imre Gáspár / János Gáspár
 Gyula Szabó - Private György Fekete / Károly Fekete
 László Márkus - SS Obersturmführer
  - Gutnacht, a German SS officer
  - Grisha, a Russian soldier
  - the Forester
  - the Forester's Wife
 Gábor Agárdy - Commander of the Levente corps (a militaristic right-wing youth movement)
 László Bánhidi - Sergeant Pál Suhajda

Plot
Somewhere in Hungary, in the last days of World War II, Corporal Ferenc Molnár is on the run on a motorbike. He has deserted his unit and taken its money with him. On his journey, he gathers around him a socially and politically diverse group of men whose aim is the same as his: Surviving the war.

Background
As a satirical comedy about the war - a novelty at the time - the film became an immediate commercial and critical sensation in mid-1960s Hungary and was seen by 2.2 million viewers. By putting a cunning everyman into the center of the plot, not heroical partisans, and satirizing all sides, this new type of war film spoke to many everyday Hungarians.

The quote Az oroszok már a spájzban vannak! (The Russians are already in the pantry!) immediately entered the spoken Hungarian language and has been used in many variations since then.

Accolades
Hungarian Film Festival 1966:
 Main award for best film (together with Twenty Hours (Húsz óra) by Zoltán Fábry and My Way Home (Így jöttem) by Miklós Jancsó) 
 Best male actor (Imre Sinkovits)
 Special Award of the Jury for best director (Márton Keleti)

Awards of the Hungarian Film Critics 1965:
 Special Award
 Best male actor (Imre Sinkovits)

References

External links 

1965 comedy films
1965 films
Hungarian comedy films
1965 war films
Hungarian war films
Hungarian World War II films